John Pearson VC (19 January 1825 – 18 April 1892) was an English recipient of the Victoria Cross, the highest and most prestigious award for gallantry in the face of the enemy that can be awarded to members of the British and Commonwealth forces.

Details
John Pearson was born 19 January 1825 in Leeds, Yorkshire, England. He married Selina Smart in the General Baptist Church in Trowbridge, Wiltshire, England on 6 April 1851. He was aged 25 and was a private in the 8th Hussars, living in the barracks in Trowbridge, the son of Stephen Pearson, a gardener. Selina Smart is shown as age 20, a spinner, a feeder by profession, living on Stallard Street, daughter of Edward Smart, a spinner.

He was 33 years old and a private in the 8th Hussars (The King's Royal Irish), British Army during the Indian Mutiny when the following deed took place:

On 17 June 1858 at Gwalior, British India, Pearson took part in a charge by a squadron of the 8th Hussars. Four men in this action, Pearson, Clement Walker Heneage, Joseph Ward, and George Hollis were awarded the Victoria Cross, the joint citation reading as follows:

Further information
He later achieved the rank of sergeant with the 19th Hussars and was awarded the Meritorious Service Medal. He died on 18 April 1892 in Lion's Head, Eastnor Township, Bruce County, Ontario after emigrating to Canada.

The medal
His VC was auctioned by Morton & Eden Ltd of London on 23 November 2004 and is now on display in the Lord Ashcroft Gallery at the Imperial War Museum, London.

References

External links
Biography of John Pearson
Burial location of John Pearson "Ontario"

1825 births
1892 deaths
8th King's Royal Irish Hussars soldiers
British recipients of the Victoria Cross
Indian Rebellion of 1857 recipients of the Victoria Cross
British Army personnel of the Crimean War
English emigrants to Canada
19th Royal Hussars soldiers
British Army recipients of the Victoria Cross
Recipients of the Meritorious Service Medal (United Kingdom)
Military personnel from Leeds
Burials in Ontario